Marcus Anthony Dove (born June 17, 1985) is an American professional basketball player for Tokyo United Basketball Club of the B3 League. In 2020–21, he was the top rebounder in the Israel Basketball Premier League. Between 2016 and 2018 he played for Kyoto Hannaryz in Japan. Dove signed with Fos Provence Basket on August 5, 2018.

Career statistics 

|-
| align="left" |  2016–17
| align="left" | Kyoto
| 55|| 44|| 22.9|| .590|| .000|| .626|| 7.7|| 1.1|| 1.8|| 0.7|| 12.2
|-
| align="left" | B1 2017–18
| align="left" | Kyoto
| 46|| 17|| 19.3|| .482|| .000|| .453|| 5.8|| 1.5|| 1.4|| 0.7||  5.5
|-
|}

References

1985 births
Living people
Aisin AW Areions Anjo players
American expatriate basketball people in Belgium
American expatriate basketball people in France
American expatriate basketball people in Israel
American expatriate basketball people in Japan
American men's basketball players
Bambitious Nara players
Basketball players from California
BCM Gravelines players
Centers (basketball)
Dakota Wizards players
Élan Chalon players
Fos Provence Basket players
Kyoto Hannaryz players
Oklahoma State Cowboys basketball players
Maccabi Ashdod B.C. players
People from Bellflower, California
RBC Pepinster players
Sportspeople from Los Angeles County, California
American expatriate basketball people in Taiwan